Becerril de Campos is a municipality located in the province of Palencia, Castile and León, Spain.

According to the 2004 census (INE), the municipality had a population of 1,028 inhabitants.

It is home to the football club CD Becerril.

Architecture

References

External links
Información, historia y fotografías de Becerril

Municipalities in the Province of Palencia